Aslan Tambiyevich Datdeyev (born 17 October 1973) is a Russian retired professional footballer.

Playing career
He made his debut in the Russian Premier League in 1994 for FC Spartak Vladikavkaz.

Honours
 Russian Premier League champion: 1995.
 Russian Premier League runner-up: 1996.

European club competitions
 UEFA Cup 1996–97 with FC Alania Vladikavkaz: 1 game.
 UEFA Cup 1997–98 with FC Alania Vladikavkaz: 3 game.
 UEFA Intertoto Cup 1999 with FC Rostselmash Rostov-on-Don: 4 games.

References

1973 births
Sportspeople from Vladikavkaz
Living people
Soviet footballers
Association football midfielders
Association football defenders
Russian footballers
Russian expatriate footballers
Expatriate footballers in Kazakhstan
FC Spartak Vladikavkaz players
Russian Premier League players
FC Rostov players
FC Kyzylzhar players
FC Shakhter Karagandy players
Russian expatriate sportspeople in Kazakhstan